This is a list of the Australian moth species of the family Immidae. It also acts as an index to the species articles and forms part of the full List of moths of Australia.

Birthana cleis (R. Felder & Rogenhofer, 1875)
Imma acosma (Turner, 1900)
Imma albifasciella (Pagenstecher, 1900)
Imma lichneopa (Lower, 1903)
Imma loxoscia Turner, 1913
Imma lyrifera Meyrick, 1910
Imma marileutis Meyrick, 1906
Imma melanosphena Meyrick, 1918
Imma platyxantha Turner, 1913
Imma stilbiota (Lower, 1903)
Imma tetrascia Meyrick, 1912
Imma vaticina Meyrick, 1912
Imma xanthosticha (Turner, 1936)

External links 
Immidae at Australian Faunal Directory

Australia